Personal Injury Court was a short-lived American syndicated nontraditional court show in which personal injury lawyer Gino Brogdon heard and ruled on personal injury cases.
  
The show was produced by 501 East Entertainment  and the re-launched Orion Television, and was distributed by MGM Domestic Television Distribution. Personal Injury Court was produced by David Armour and Barry Poznick and Co-Created by Gary Martin Hays.

Show Details
Personal Injury Court was a half-hour nontraditional reenacted court show. The show featured cases involving personal injury. The show used videos, testimonies, accident recreations and eye-witness accounts to determine verdicts. The show debuted on September 16, 2019.

The show claimed to award some of the largest claims in television, however, the cases presented were inspired by actual litigation, with names and details changed. The executive producer claimed that real legal principles are used in the explanations. The participants are paid actors. The show airs in 47 of 50 the largest United States  television markets. The show reached its highest ratings of the season to date during the week of February 23, 2020, which would ultimately be its last week of first-run episodes, when it earned a 0.7 rating.

Personal Injury Court was part of a suite of specialty court shows that MGM Television offered; it was preceded by Lauren Lake's Paternity Court (focusing on paternity testing) and Couples Court with the Cutlers (which resolves relationship disputes), all of which were axed by MGM in the wake of COVID-19 and related financial problems.

Cancellation
Personal Injury Court ceased delivering new episodes to its affiliates and updating its social media accounts in late February 2020.

References

External links 
 
 

2010s American reality television series
2019 American television series debuts
2020 American television series endings
First-run syndicated television programs in the United States
English-language television shows
Television series by MGM Television
Court shows